Prime View is one of the MTR Light Rail stops. It is located at ground level at Castle Peak Road next to Prime View Garden in Tuen Mun District. It began service on 2 February 1992 and belongs to Zone 2. It serves Prime View Garden and nearby areas.

References

MTR Light Rail stops
Former Kowloon–Canton Railway stations
Tuen Mun District
Railway stations in Hong Kong opened in 1992
MTR Light Rail stops named from housing estates
1992 establishments in Hong Kong